The Winsor McCay Award is given to individuals in recognition of lifetime or career contributions to the art of animation in producing, directing, animating, design, writing, voice acting, sound and sound effects, technical work, music, professional teaching, and for other endeavors which exhibit outstanding contributions to excellence in animation.

The award is presented at the annual Annie Awards, presented by the International Animated Film Society, ASIFA-Hollywood.  The award was established in 1972, and is named in honor of pioneer animator Winsor McCay.

Recipients
 † Posthumously awarded

See also
 List of animation awards

References

External links
 Windsory McCay Award at Annie Awards. Archived from the original on June 12, 2015.
 ASIFA-Hollywood official site

Annie Awards
Lifetime achievement awards
Awards established in 1972
History of animation